Battus is a synonym for several agnostid trilobites, now assigned to other genera.


Etymology 
In Greek mythology, Battus is a shepherd who witnessed Hermes stealing Apollo's cattle. Because he broke his promise not to reveal this theft, Hermes turned him to stone.

Taxonomy 
Battus Barrande, 1846 was no longer available since Giovanni Antonio Scopoli used  Battus in 1777 for a genus of swallowtail butterflies.

Trilobite species previously assigned to Battus 
A number of species previously assigned to the genus Battus have since been transferred to other genera:
 B. bibullatus = Phalacroma bibullatus
 B. cuneiferus = Diplorrhina cuneifera
 B. granulatum  =  Pleuroctenium granulatum
 B. integer = Peronopsis integer
 B. laevigatus = Lejopyge laevigata
 B. nudus = Phalagnostus nudus
 B. rex = Condylopyge rex
 B. tardus = Trinodus tarda

References 

Agnostida
Disused trilobite generic names